Freta may refer to:

 Freta Street (or ulica Freta), in Warsaw New Town, Poland
Freta (Titan), plural of Fretum,  channels found on Saturn's moon Titan
Batterie de la Freta, fortification in France, part of the Ceintures de Lyon

See also